Washington County Courthouse may refer to:

 St. Stephens Courthouse, St. Stephens, Alabama, formerly the Washington County Courthouse
 Washington County Courthouse (Arkansas), Fayetteville, Arkansas
 Washington County Courthouse (Florida), Chipley, Florida
 Washington County Courthouse (Georgia), Sandersonville, Georgia
 Washington County Courthouse (Idaho), Weiser, Idaho
 Washington County Courthouse (Illinois), Nashville, Illinois
 Washington County Courthouse (Indiana), Salem, Indiana
 Washington County Courthouse (Iowa), Washington, Iowa
 Washington County Courthouse (Kansas), Washington, Kansas
 Washington County Courthouse (Kentucky), Springfield, Kentucky
 Washington County Courthouse (Maine), Machias, Maine
 Washington County Courthouse (Maryland), Hagerstown, Maryland
 Washington County Courthouse (Minnesota), Stillwater, Minnesota
 Washington County Courthouse (Mississippi), Greenville, Mississippi
 Washington County Courthouse (Missouri), Potosi, Missouri
 Washington County Courthouse (Nebraska), Blair, Nebraska
 Washington County Courthouse (North Carolina), Plymouth, North Carolina
 Washington County Courthouse (Ohio), Marietta, Ohio
 Old Washington County Courthouse (Oklahoma), Bartlesville, Oklahoma
 Washington County Courthouse (Oregon), Hillsboro, Oregon
 Washington County Courthouse (Pennsylvania), Washington, Pennsylvania
 Washington County Courthouse (Rhode Island), South Kingstown, Rhode Island
 Washington County Courthouse (Texas), Brenham, Texas
 Old Washington County Courthouse (Utah), St. George, Utah
 Washington County Courthouse and Jail, West Bend, Wisconsin